Curt "Curre" Lundmark (born 9 September 1944) is a Swedish former ice hockey player and manager. Acting as a head coach, he led the Swedish men's national team to a gold medal during the 1994 Olympic Winter Games in Lillehammer. Earlier he'd also assisted Conny Evensson when Sweden won the 1991 IIHF World Championship in Turku and the 1992 IIHF World Championship in Prague. Led by Curt Lundmark, the Swedes also won a silver medal during the 1995 IIHF World Championship in Stockholm, losing the final game against Finland (1-4). Curt Lundmark resigned after that tournament, and was replaced by Kent Forsberg.

He has also coached club teams like Västerås IK, HV 71, Jokerit and Leksands IF. For some years he was also the SVT Sport expert commentator, often working with Åsa E. Jönsson or Staffan Lindeborg.

References 

1944 births
Living people
Swedish ice hockey managers
Swedish ice hockey defencemen
Sweden men's national ice hockey team coaches